Dear Santa is the christmas EP (third overall) by Girls' Generation-TTS, sub-unit of the South Korean girl group Girls' Generation. It was released digitally and physically on December 4, 2015 by S.M. Entertainment.

Background and release
After releasing their 2nd EP, Holler, in 2014, Girls' Generation-TTS aimed to put out their next release a Christmas special album. They wanted to have a more comfortable and warm concept compared to their previous releases. Members Taeyeon and Tiffany proceeded to start on the album preparation in February 2015. Later on, member Seohyun participated in writing the Korean lyrics for the album's title song, "Dear Santa". In an interview, member Tiffany has said that the group wanted to put together an album that would "accentuate" their vocals. The album was released on December 4, 2015 with six tracks. The title song, "Dear Santa" was released in both English and Korean languages. As an effort to support music education for children in Asia, the group contributed a part of the album's sales profits to a charity called "SMile for U", a campaign held between SM Entertainment and UNICEF.

Singles
The title track "Dear Santa" was described to have mixed genres, including ballad and R&B melodies as well as a combination of upbeat and swing jazz sounds. Lyrically, it talks about a woman making wishes to Santa Claus, hoping to work things out with her boyfriend to spend Christmas time together. Fuse ranked the song as one among their lists of "Best Holiday Songs of 2015" and "K-pop's 25 Best Christmas Songs".

"Winter Story" was described to have a guitar-led sound that brings out Girls' Generation-TTS's "soulful" vocals. A live acoustic version of the song was released on December 11, 2015.

Promotion
Girls' Generation-TTS performed the title track "Dear Santa" and other side tracks on KBS's Music Bank, MBC's Music Core, and SBS's Inkigayo.

Track listing
Credits adapted from Naver

Charts

Year-end chart

Sales

Release history

References

External links
 
 

2015 EPs
Girls' Generation albums
2015 Christmas albums
SM Entertainment EPs
Genie Music EPs
Korean-language EPs
Christmas albums by South Korean artists